Mohd Safee bin Mohd Sali (born 29 January 1984) is a former Malaysian footballer who formerly played for Malaysia Super League club Kuala Lumpur City as a forward. He is considered to be one of the greatest Malaysian footballers of all time, especially on the international stage.

In 2011, Safee became the first Malaysian to play in the Indonesia Super League with Pelita Jaya. He also played for Kuala Lumpur FA, Telekom Melaka, Sarawak, Selangor, Johor Darul Ta'zim, PKNS, Perlis and Petaling Jaya City before returning to Kuala Lumpur.

A Malaysian international between 2006 and 2017, Safee won the 2010 AFF Championship and scored a total of nine goals in four consecutive editions of the tournament.

In 21 February 2023, Safee Sali announced his retirement from professional football at the age of 39. He have 76 caps and 23 goals with Malaysia national football team on the international stage and score a total of 180 goals (153 goals with Malaysian League club, 27 goals with Indonesian League club) in club football.

Club career

Kuala Lumpur FA
Safee was brought to Kuala Lumpur FA by coach Igor Novak. He scored his first hat-trick in a MPL 2 match against Perak TKN, which ended 6-2. He netted 11 goals in his first season to become the second top local goalscorer behind Azman Adnan. However, during the 2004 season, he only managed to score 2 league goals. In his last season with Kuala Lumpur, he scored 7 league goals, 3 goals in the 2005 Malaysia FA Cup, where Kuala Lumpur reached the semi-finals, as well as 1 goal in the 2005 Malaysia Cup.

TMFC
Safee was loan to TMFC for the 2003 Malaysia Cup after Kuala Lumpur failed to qualify for the cup competition. He scored one goal in the competition against Sarawak in their final group match. He return to Kuala Lumpur following TMFC failure to qualify for the knockout round.

Sarawak FA
Safee later joined Sarawak FA. He became the top local goalscorer with 10 goals. At the end of the season, he scored a total of 19 goals in all competition, making him the top scorer for Sarawak during the 2005/06 season.

Selangor FA
In 2006/2007 season, Safee joined Selangor FA. He was given the number 10 jersey which was once worn by legendary Selangor FA and Malaysian national team player, the late Mokhtar Dahari. With Selangor, Safee impressed K. Devan by bringing the team both to the FA Cup and Malaysia Cup final. However, Selangor lost to Kedah FA in both finals with the same score of 3–2. He scored a total of 11 goals in his first season with Selangor.

On his second season with Selangor, he scored 11 goals in 10 matches, but he had an injury that made him missed half of the 2007/08 season. He returned to be the second top scorer on the 2010 Season. He also scored the winning goal for Selangor in a 2–1 win against Negeri Sembilan FA at the 2010 Malaysia Charity Shield.

After the 2010 AFF Suzuki Cup and his superb performance at the early stages in the 2011 Super League Malaysia season, Safee agreed to join the Indonesian Super League team, Pelita Jaya to gain more experience. Safee's last game with Selangor was a 1–1 draw against Kuala Lumpur FA. This was Safee's last game before his departure to Karawang, Indonesia to join Pelita Jaya.

Pelita Jaya
On 5 February 2011, Safee officially transferred to the Indonesian Super League team, Pelita Jaya on a USD 30,000 transfer fee and his salary reached USD 10,000 or RM 30,360. . Safee signed a 1 year contract with Pelita Jaya. This transfer made Safee the first Malaysian player to play in the Indonesian Super League. Safee originally was given the number 10 shirt. But due to a registration problem, he chose the number 55 instead of his original number. Safee made his league debut against Sriwijaya. Safee scored 7 goals in 13 appearances in his first season with Pelita.

On 12 October 2011, Safee was announced as the captain of Pelita Jaya for the upcoming 2011–12 Indonesia Super League season and changed his jersey number to 10 instead. On 24 March 2012, Safee managed to score four goals against Gresik United. Safee ended the season with 20 league goals.

Cardiff City trial
In 2011, Safee was offered a two-week trial with Football League Championship club, Cardiff City.

Arema Cronus
In 2013 season, Safee transferred to Arema Cronus.

Johor Darul Takzim
In 2013, Safee returned to Malaysia to join Johor Darul Takzim. He made his debut and scored two goals in the pre-season match against Melaka United. In 2015, Safee was selected to start in the 2015 AFC Cup Final in a 1–0 victory against Istiklol at Pamir Stadium.

PKNS
Safee signed with PKNS in 2017. He spent two season and made 33 league appearances scoring 9 goals.

Perlis and PJ City
In 2019, Safee briefly played for Perlis. Malaysian Football League (MFL) canceled Perlis participation in the league due to their financial planning were insufficient to manage the team for competition in the M-League. He later signed with PJ City on 20 February 2019.

Kuala Lumpur City
Safee signed with Kuala Lumpur City on 24 December 2020. He made his debut in a 1-0 defeat against Penang on 6 March 2021. In 2021 Malaysia Cup, Safee won his first ever Malaysia Cup title in 20 years of his career after defeating Johor Darul Ta'zim 2-0 in the final. In 2022, Safee set a record as the first Malaysian footballer to play in two AFC Cup finals as he come in as substitutes in a 3-0 defeat against Al Seeb.

International career

Youth team
Safee started representing Malaysia Under-23 during the 2004 Olympic Games qualifiers. He played all the qualification matches but mostly played as the substitute. He was then selected to represent Malaysia Under-23 at the 2005 Pre-South East Asian Games in Thailand under the then-coach Bertalan Bicskei. He managed to score only one goal in the tournament against the Philippines Under-23. He however did not make it into 2005 South East Asian Games squad that won the bronze medal. After the 2005 South East Asian Games, Safee was given a chance by coach Norizan Bakar to represent the Under-23 side for the 2006 Doha Asian Games. He again failed to make it into the squad.

After the national Under-23 sides failure in the 2006 Asian Games, Safee was selected as the main striker by coach B. Sathianathan. Together with striking partner Mohd Zaquan Adha Abdul Radzak, they managed to win the 2007 Merdeka Tournament after defeating Myanmar 3–1 in the final and becoming the top scorer with 4 goals. He then was chosen to represent the country in the 2007 South East Asian Games in Thailand. Safee managed to score 2 goals in the tournament but the Under-23 national team failed to advance into the semifinal after a draw against rivals the Singapore.

For 2008, Safee was chosen as the main striker in the 2008 Malaysia Intercontinental Cup. He managed to score all Malaysia's 3 goals in Malaysia's 1–3 defeat to the Republic of Ireland, 1–0 win against the Iraq and an impressive 1–1 draw against the Nigeria. The match against Nigeria was Safee's last game with Malaysia national under-23 team.

In 2010, Safee received called up for the Asian Games squad. He played three matches in Eximbank Cup in Vietnam. He did not chosen as the three senior members for the final squad to the Asian Games.

Senior team
After an impressive season with Sarawak in the Malaysia Premier League, Safee managed to make it into the national team. He was given his first senior caps against New Zealand on 19 February 2006. He then scored his first international goal on his second cap against New Zealand.

He then became the part of the national football team preparing for the 2007 AFC Asian Cup. He was then chosen into the squad of Malaysia 2007 Asian Cup. He only made his first appearance in the Asian Cup in the third group match against Iran where Malaysia lost 0–3.

For the 2008 Merdeka Tournament, Safee scored another similar style of goal that was scored earlier during the 2008 Sultan of selangor Cup against the Nepal. He became the top scorer of the tournament with 5 goals despite Malaysia losing 6–5 through penalty kicks against Vietnam in the final.

In November 2010, Safee was called up to the Malaysia national squad by coach K. Rajagopal for the 2010 AFF Suzuki Cup. Safee scored twice against Vietnam to secure a 2–0 win in the first leg in the semi finals. Safee again scored another two goals in the first leg of the finals to secure a 3–0 win against Indonesia. On the second leg of the Final, Safee scored another goal to earn 5 goals, thus becoming the tournaments top goal scorer. Malaysia won the 2010 AFF Suzuki Cup 2010 title for the first time in their history.

On 28 November 2012, Safee netted in his third consecutive AFF Championship tournament, scoring the second goal in Malaysia's 4–1 win over Laos in their second group match. On 29 November 2014, Safee netted in his fourth consecutive AFF Championship tournament, scoring the first goal in Malaysia's 3–1 win over Singapore in their third group match. Other than that, he was invisible throughout the tournament.

Malaysia XI
Safee also represented in the Malaysia XI squad against Arsenal and Liverpool at the Shah Alam Stadium on 29 July 2008. He was one of the impressive Malaysian players on the match. The Malaysia XI eventually lost.

On 16 July 2011, Safee was included in the match against Liverpool in which the Malaysia XI lost 3–6. He came on as a substitute and scored 2 goals.

Attributes
Safee previously wears the legendary jersey No. 10 which was once worn by legendary Selangor FA and Malaysian national team player, the late Mokhtar Dahari. He is a member of the Malaysia national football team. His aggressive playing style, combined with great pace, good physique despite his height of 171 cm and his shooting techniques recently made him a regular first team member for the national team. Being one of the Malaysian players with the best flair, Safee also contributes spectacular goals with his long shots and overhead kicks for both the national team and Selangor FA.

Social media controversy
Safee gained notoriety on social media after lashing out at fans for criticising his poor performances for the Malaysian national team in the 2014 AFF Suzuki Cup. After a 3–2 loss to Thailand in the group stage of the tournament, he responded to negative comments on Instagram by saying in Malay: .

Malaysia succeeded in making it to the final anyway, after overturning a 2–1 semi-final first leg deficit to win 5–3 on aggregate against Vietnam in the second leg. Safee was rested for the second leg, reportedly due to injury. Following the victory over Vietnam, he posted an Instagram photo of himself celebrating, with the caption (translated): "To the fans who swapped flags after being told off last time, don't hide your faces behind pillows ok..just wipe them with tissues". One of the photo's hashtags said "#amikkau", which means "take that" in Malay. This outraged Malaysian fans further, and Safee was booed by home supporters during the final game against Thailand.

Commercial endorsements
Safee is under sponsorship with American sports-brand, Nike, after previously being the face of Adidas for South East Asia. Safee was given his own Mercurial Football Boot with his name on it. It was given exclusively by Nike.

Career statistics

Club

International Appearances

International goals
Scores and results list Malaysia's goal tally first.

Honours

Club
Selangor
 Malaysian Charity Shield: 2009, 2010
 Malaysian Super League: 2009, 2010
 Malaysian FA Cup: 2009

Johor Darul Ta'zim
 Malaysia Super League: 2014, 2015, 2016
 Malaysian Charity Shield: 2015, 2016
 Malaysia FA Cup: 2016
 AFC Cup: 2015

KL City FC
 Malaysia Cup: 2021
 AFC Cup: runners-up 2022

International
Malaysia
 Merdeka Tournament: 2007
 AFF Championship: 2010; 
AFF Championship: runners-up 2014

Individual honours
 Merdeka Tournament top goalscorer: 2007, 2008
 AFF Championship top goalscorer: 2010
 Goal.com readers' Asian Best XI of 2011

References

External links
 
 
 Mohd Safee Mohd Sali's Pelita Jaya FC
 
 
 
 
 

1984 births
Living people
People from Selangor
Malaysian people of Malay descent
Malaysian people of Javanese descent
Malaysian footballers
Malaysia international footballers
2007 AFC Asian Cup players
Malaysian expatriate footballers
Malaysian expatriate sportspeople in Indonesia
Expatriate footballers in Indonesia
Kuala Lumpur City F.C. players
Melaka TM FC players
Sarawak FA players
Selangor FA players
Pelita Jaya FC players
Pelita Bandung Raya players
Perlis FA players
Arema F.C. players
Johor Darul Ta'zim F.C. players
Malaysia Super League players
Liga 1 (Indonesia) players
PKNS F.C. players
Association football forwards
AFC Cup winning players